Aaron Edward Carroll is an American pediatrician and professor of pediatrics at Indiana University School of Medicine. At Indiana University, he is also the Vice Chair for Health Policy and Outcomes Research and the Director of the Center for Health Policy and Professionalism Research.

Education
Carroll received his B.A. in chemistry from Amherst College in 1994 and his M.D. from the University of Pennsylvania School of Medicine in 1998. After receiving his M.D., he completed his internship and residency in pediatrics  at the University of Washington, where he received his M.S. in health services research in 2003. While there, he was a fellow in the Robert Wood Johnson Clinical Scholars Program.

Work
Carroll's research focuses on information technology in pediatrics, cost-effectiveness analyses in medicine, and health policy. Along with Rachel C. Vreeman, he co-authored the 2011 book Don't Cross Your Eyes ... They'll Get Stuck That Way! And 75 Other Health Myths Debunked, which debunks medical myths. Along with Austin Frakt, he writes a column for The New York Times called "The New Health Care", where he gave his own experiences with ulcerative colitis as an example of the benefits and difficulties of the health care system. He and Frakt are also co-editors-in-chief of the medical blog the Incidental Economist. Carroll is also the host of the YouTube series "Healthcare Triage".

References

External links
Faculty page

 www.nytimes.com: Doubtful Science Behind Arguments to Restrict Birth Control Access (10 10 2017)

Living people
American pediatricians
Indiana University School of Medicine faculty
Amherst College alumni
Perelman School of Medicine at the University of Pennsylvania alumni
University of Washington alumni
American bloggers
The New York Times columnists
21st-century American non-fiction writers
Year of birth missing (living people)